Enzo Araciel Borges Couto (born 22 July 1986) is a Uruguayan footballer who plays as a striker for Deportivo Maldonado

Career

Borges started his career with Uruguayan top flight side Wanderers. After that, he played for 14 de Julho, Bagé, and Rio Grande in the Brazilian lower leagues. 

Before the second half of 2012/13, Borges signed for Uruguayan top flight club Cerro Largo after playing for Sarandí Universitario in the Uruguayan lower leagues.

Before the 2016 season, he signed for Peruvian top flight team La Bocana.

Before the 2018 season, Borges signed for Nacional Potosí in Bolivia, where he suffered from the altitude.

In 2018, he signed for Peruvian second division outfit Coopsol.

Before the 2020 season, Borges returned to Cerro Largo.

References

External links

 

Uruguayan footballers
Association football forwards
Expatriate footballers in Bolivia
Expatriate footballers in Peru
Uruguayan Primera División players
People from Rivera Department
1986 births
Cerro Largo F.C. players
Peruvian Segunda División players
Peruvian Primera División players
Bolivian Primera División players
Uruguayan Segunda División players
Juan Aurich footballers
Comerciantes Unidos footballers
Defensor La Bocana players
Nacional Potosí players
Montevideo Wanderers F.C. players
Club Sportivo Cerrito players
Deportivo Coopsol players
Uruguayan expatriates in Peru
Uruguayan expatriates in Brazil
Uruguayan expatriates in Bolivia
Uruguayan expatriate footballers
Expatriate footballers in Brazil
Living people